The Last Chance is a 1926 American silent Western film directed by Horace B. Carpenter and starring Bill Patton, Dorothy Donald and Merrill McCormick.

Cast
 Bill Patton as Bill Dexter 
 Dorothy Donald as Miss Stubbins
 Merrill McCormick as 'Black' Bart
 Harry O'Connor as Bill Stubbins 
 Walter Patton as Postmaster
 Theodore Henderson as Sheriff
 Walter Blunt as Pete Walcolm

References

Bibliography
 Connelly, Robert B. The Silents: Silent Feature Films, 1910-36, Volume 40, Issue 2. December Press, 1998.
 Munden, Kenneth White. The American Film Institute Catalog of Motion Pictures Produced in the United States, Part 1. University of California Press, 1997.

External links
 

1926 films
1926 Western (genre) films
1920s English-language films
American silent feature films
Silent American Western (genre) films
American black-and-white films
Films directed by Horace B. Carpenter
Chesterfield Pictures films
1920s American films